Phạm Thị Hương (born 4 September 1991) is a Vietnamese model, college lecturer and beauty pageant titleholder who was crowned as Miss Universe Vietnam 2015 on October 3, 2015 at Crown Convention Center, Nha Trang City, Vietnam. She represented Vietnam at Miss Universe 2015 but unplaced.

Personal life
Hương was born on September 4, 1991 in Haiphong, Vietnam. In 2010, she moved to Hanoi for studying and graduated from International, Administration and Marketing Major of Vietnam Commercial University (currently Thuongmai University). Besides being a fashion model, she is also a lecturer at Saigon College of Arts, Culture and Tourism in Ho Chi Minh City, Vietnam. Previously, she participated in Vietnam's Next Top Model 2010, where she finished in eighth place. Later, she was named the first runner-up at the 2014 Miss World Sport, a beauty pageant in the framework of the 2014 Winter Olympics in Sochi, Russia. At the same year, she also made the cut into top 10 of Miss Vietnam 2014.

Career

2010: Modelling and big turn at 24 
Previously, she participated in Vietnam's Next Top Model 2010, where she finished in eighth place. Later, she was named the first runner-up at the 2014 Miss World Sport, a beauty pageant in the framework of the 2014 Winter Olympics in Sochi, Russia. At the same year, she also made the cut into top 10 of Miss Vietnam 2014. She used to compete in F-Idol 2011 (winner), Ngoi Sao Nguoi Mau Ngay Mai 2012 (Top 5). As signing contract with VC Modeling Agency, she continued to perform in fashion shows such as: Thoi Trang va Nhan Vat (Fashion and Characters), Duyen Dang Viet Nam (Charming Vietnam), Ky Niem 18 nam cua NTK Hoang Hai (Fashion designer Hoang Hai's 18 year anniversary), Tap Le Thoi Trang tai Ha Noi,...

In 2013, she moved to Ho Chi Minh City and competed in Nu Hoang Trang Suc Viet Nam 2013 (Top 5), Hoa Hau The Thao The Gioi (1st runner up, Russia), and Hoa Hau Viet Nam 2014 (Top 10) as well as becoming college lecturer at Sai Gon Culture Arts and Tourism College at the age of 23.

At the age of 24, she competed in Miss Universe Vietnam 2015 and was crowned by Miss Universe Vietnam 2008 Nguyễn Thùy Lâm. After the pageant, famous French fashion consultant  Ines Ligron posted a compliment on her social media for Pham Huong.

2015: Miss Universe (Las Vegas, USA) 
Early December 2015, she represented for Vietnam at Miss Universe which was held in Las Vegas, USA. She made to the Top 15 Favorite Contestants that voted by the audience. Despite good performance and well preparation, she didn't make to Top 15. She was named "Hoa Hau Quoc Dan" (Vietnam National Miss) for her effort in promoting Vietnam to everyone around the globe. The Richest picked Pham Huong for Top 50 World's Most Beautiful Women.

After the pageant, she was nominated for We Choice Awards as one of the Top 10 Inspiration Characters which was voted by the audience. She joined in TV show Bua Trua Vui Ve and shared her journey with everyone.

2016: Coach of The Face Vietnam 
January 22, 2016, at the auction of Gala Tu Thien, she brought a portrait of herself and 79 signatures of 79 contestants of Miss Universe 2015 as contribution for the charity foundation after the auction.

At the end of 2014, she was a coach of The Face Vietnam 1st season, alongside Ho Ngoc Ha and Tran Ngoc Lan Khue. In the final, her member Do Tran Khanh Ngan was a runner-up.

2017: Consultant of Toi La Hoa Hau Hoan Vu Viet Nam and coach of The Look Viet Nam 
April 3, 2017, she released a song Va Lang Nghe Minh which was composed by Chau Dang Khoa as a tribute to her fan . Later she shared that she had no intention switching to singing and want to learn more.

At the end of April, she was the consultant of Futurista - Nguoi Ke Vi Tuong Lai which was a part of TV show Toi La Hoa Hau Hoan Vu Viet Nam at 5 big cities.

September 30, she was a judge alongside main judge in TV show Toi La Hoa Hau Hoan Vu Viet Nam first season.

Besides this, she was a coach of The Look Vietnam alongside Nguyen Minh Tu and Nguyen Cao Ky Duyen. October 11, her team member Ngo Phuong Linh won a contract with the main sponsor of The Look Vietnam.

2018: Fashion Designer 
On January 6, she appeared in the final of the Miss Universe Vietnam 2017 pageant in Nha Trang, where she won the pageant. She took a final walk before crowning Miss Universe Vietnam H'Hen Niê.

On May 11, she released her first fashion collection and held a fashion show themed "Girl Boss."

Miss Universe Vietnam 2015
Hương was crowned Miss Universe Vietnam on October 3, 2015. Also, she won a special award of Miss Beach Beauty. As the title holder of Miss Universe Vietnam 2015, she competed at Miss Universe 2015.

Miss Universe 2015
Hương represented Vietnam at the Miss Universe 2015 pageant in Las Vegas on 20 December. Her roommates during her stay were Miss Universe Thailand Aniporn Chalermburanawong and Miss Dominican Republic Clarissa Molina. Despite proving to be a very popular contestant, one of the favorites on the pageant observers' lists and predictions, she failed to place.

References

External links
Ảnh Hoa Hậu Phạm Hương
hoahauhoanvuvietnam.com
Official Miss Universe Vietnam Organization Facebook

l

1991 births
Living people
Top Model contestants
Miss Universe 2015 contestants
Vietnamese beauty pageant winners
People from Haiphong
Vietnamese female models
21st-century Vietnamese women